Alina Sergeevna Myagkova (born 15 January 1999) is a Russian footballer who plays as a midfielder for Lokomotiv Moscow.

Career

Before the 2018 season, Myagkova signed for Russian side Lokomotiv (Moscow), helping them win the league, their first major trophy. Before the 2020 season, she joined Syracuse Orange in the United States. Before the second half of 2021–22 season, she signed for Italian club Verona.

References

External links
 Alina Myagkova at playmakerstats.com

1999 births
Living people
Women's association football midfielders
Central Michigan Chippewas women's soccer players
Expatriate women's footballers in Italy
Expatriate women's soccer players in the United States
Russia women's international footballers
Russian expatriate sportspeople in Italy
Russian expatriate sportspeople in the United States
Russian Women's Football Championship players
Russian women's footballers
Serie A (women's football) players
Syracuse Orange women's soccer players
WFC Lokomotiv Moscow players